Powm Beach is a hamlet in the Canadian province of Saskatchewan.It is on the shore of Turtle Lake.

Demographics 

References

Designated places in Saskatchewan
Mervin No. 499, Saskatchewan
Organized hamlets in Saskatchewan
Division No. 17, Saskatchewan